Mimeugnosta is a genus of moths belonging to the family Tortricidae.

Species
Mimeugnosta arta Razowski & Becker, 1986
Mimeugnosta chascax Razowski, 1994
Mimeugnosta credibilis Razowski & Becker, 2002
Mimeugnosta enopla Razowski & Becker, 1986
Mimeugnosta particeps Razowski, 1986

See also
List of Tortricidae genera

References

 , 1986, Acta zool. cracov. 29: 416.
 , 2011: Diagnoses and remarks on genera of Tortricidae, 2: Cochylini (Lepidoptera: Tortricidae). Shilap Revista de Lepidopterologia 39 (156): 397–414.
 , 2002: Systematic and faunistic data on Neotropical Cochylini (Lepidoptera: Tortricidae), with descriptions of new species. Part.1. Acta zool. cracov. 45: 287-316

External links
tortricidae.com

Cochylini
Tortricidae genera